In the United States military, a general is the most senior general-grade officer; it is the highest achievable commissioned officer rank (or echelon) that may be attained in the United States Armed Forces, with exception of the Navy and Coast Guard, which have the equivalent rank of admiral instead. The official and formal insignia of "general" is defined by its four stars (commonly silver and in a row).

The rank of general ranks above a three-star lieutenant general and below the special wartime five-star ranks of General of the Army or General of the Air Force. The Marine Corps and Space Force do not have an established grade above general. The pay grade of general is O-10. It is equivalent to the rank of admiral in the other United States uniformed services which use naval ranks. It is abbreviated as GEN in the Army and Gen in the Marine Corps, Air Force, and Space Force.

Since the ranks of General of the Army and General of the Air Force are reserved for wartime use only, the rank of general is the highest general officer rank in peacetime.

Address
Formally, the term “General” is always used when referring to a four-star general. However, a number of different terms may refer to them informally, since lower-ranking generals may also be referred to as simply “General”.

Statutory limits

The United States Code explicitly limits the total number of general officers (termed flag officers in the Navy and Coast Guard) that may be on active duty at any given time. The total number of active duty general officers is capped at 231 for the Army, 62 for the Marine Corps, 198 for the Air Force, and 162 for the Navy. No more than about 25% of a service's active duty general or flag officers may have more than two stars, and statute sets the total number of four-star officers allowed in each service. This is set at seven Army generals, two Marine generals, eight Air Force generals, two Space Force generals, six Navy admirals, and two Coast Guard admirals.

Several of these slots are reserved by statute. For example, the two highest-ranking members of each service (the service chief and deputy service chief) are designated as generals. For the Army the Chief of Staff and the Vice Chief of Staff are generals; for the Marine Corps, the Commandant and the Assistant Commandant are both generals; for the Air Force, the Chief of Staff and Vice Chief of Staff are generals; and for the Space Force, the Chief of Space Operations, and the Vice Chief of Space Operations are generals. In addition, for the National Guard, the Chief of the National Guard Bureau is a general under active duty in the Army or Air Force.

There are several exceptions to these limits allowing more than allotted within the statute:
An officer serving as Chairman or Vice Chairman of the Joint Chiefs of Staff; 
an officer serving as Chief of the National Guard Bureau counts only against their service's four-star cap; 
the commander of a Unified Combatant Command;
the commander of United States Forces Korea;
officers serving in certain intelligence positions i.e. the Director of the Central Intelligence Agency;
officers serving in four-star slots added by the President to one service which are offset by removing an equivalent number from other services.
 
Finally, all statutory limits may be waived at the President's discretion during time of war or national emergency.

Appointment and tour length

Four-star grades go hand-in-hand with the positions of office to which they are linked, so the rank is temporary; the active rank of general can only be held for so long- though upon retirement, if satisfactory service requirements are met, the general or admiral is normally allowed to hold that rank in retirement, rather than reverting to a lower position, as was formerly usually the case. Their active rank expires with the expiration of their term of office, which is usually set by statute. Generals are nominated for the appointment by the President from any eligible officers holding the rank of brigadier general or above who meet the requirements for the position, with the advice of the Secretary of Defense, service secretary (Secretary of the Army, Secretary of the Navy, or Secretary of the Air Force), and if applicable the Joint Chiefs of Staff. For some positions, statute allows the President to waive those requirements for a nominee deemed to serve national interests. The nominee must be confirmed by the United States Senate before the appointee can take office and assume the rank. 
General ranks may also be given by act of Congress but this is extremely rare. The standard tour for most general positions is three years, bundled as a two-year term plus a one-year extension, with the following exceptions:

Service chiefs serve for four years in one four-year term.
The Chief of the National Guard Bureau serves a nominal four years.

Extensions of the standard tour length can be approved, within statutory limits, by their respective service secretaries, the Secretary of Defense, the President, or Congress but these are rare, as they block other officers from being promoted. Some statutory limits can be waived in times of national emergency or war.

Retirement
Other than voluntary retirement, statute sets a number of mandates for retirement. A general must retire after 40 years of service unless they are reappointed to serve longer. Otherwise all general officers must retire the month after their 64th birthday. However, the Secretary of Defense can defer a general's retirement until the officer's 66th birthday and the President can defer it until the officer's 68th birthday. To retire at four-star grade, an officer must accumulate at least three years of satisfactory active duty service in that grade, as certified by the Secretary of Defense.

History and origins

See also
List of active duty United States four-star officers
List of United States Army four-star generals
List of United States Marine Corps four-star generals
List of United States Air Force four-star generals
List of United States Space Force four-star generals
List of United States military leaders by rank
Staff (military)
Title 10 of the United States Code
United States Army officer rank insignia
United States Marine Corps officer rank insignia
United States Air Force officer rank insignia

References

Military ranks of the United States Army
Military ranks of the United States Marine Corps
Officer ranks of the United States Air Force
Officer ranks of the United States Space Force
Four-star officers